is a town located in Aomori Prefecture, Japan. , the town had an estimated population of 9,146 in 4141 households, and a population density of 60 persons per km2.

Geography
Sannohe occupies an inland area in southeast corner of Aomori Prefecture, south of the Hakkōda Mountains. The terrain is relatively flat, with mountains extending in the northwestern part of the town. The Mabechi River flows from north to south through the center of the town.

Neighbouring municipalities 
Aomori Prefecture
Nanbu
Takko
Shingō
Iwate Prefecture
Ninohe
Akita Prefecture
Kazuno

Climate
The town has a cold maritime climate characterized by cool short summers and long cold winters with heavy snowfall (Köppen climate classification Cfa). The average annual temperature in Sannohe is 10.2 °C. The average annual rainfall is 1259 mm with September as the wettest month. The temperatures are highest on average in August, at around 22.9 °C, and lowest in January, at around -2.5 °C.

Demographics
Per Japanese census data, the population of Sannohe peaked in the 1950s has steadily declined since. It is now less than it was a century ago.

History
The area around Sannohe has been inhabited since ancient times, and numerous Jōmon period remains have been found. During the Kamakura period it was the center of the domains awarded to Nanbu Mitsuyuki, a retainer of Minamoto no Yoritomo after the defeat of the Northern Fujiwara clan in 1187. It remained under the control of the Nanbu clan through the Sengoku period as a castle town centered on Sannohe Castle. During the Edo period, came under the control of Morioka Domain, and a daikansho was established on the site of the former castle. It was proclaimed a town after Meiji Restoration, with the establishment of the modern municipalities system on 1 April 1889. On 20 March 1955, the three neighboring villages of Sarube, Tomesaki and Tonai merged with Sannohe.

Government
Sannohe has a mayor-council form of government with a directly elected mayor and a unicameral town council of 14 members. Sannohe is part of Sannohe District which contributes three members to the Aomori Prefectural Assembly. In terms of national politics, the city is part of Aomori 2nd district of the lower house of the Diet of Japan.

Economy
The economy of Sannohe is heavily dependent on agriculture, with tobacco as the main crop, followed by rice and apples. Due to its many historical relics, the town is also developing tourism as a mainstay of the local economy.

Education
Sannohe has two public elementary schools and one public middle schools operated by the town government and one public high school operated by the Aomori Prefectural Board of Education.

Transportation

Railway
  Aoimori Railway Company - Aoimori Railway Line

Highway

International relations
 Tamworth, New South Wales, Australia since 2001

Local attractions
Sannohe Castle, a reconstructed Japanese castle
Nakuidake Prefectural Natural Park

Noted people from Sannohe
Kagamisato Kiyoji, sumo wrestler
Kanpei Matsuo, politician
Noboru Baba, illustrator, manga artist

References

External links

Official Website 

 
Towns in Aomori Prefecture